Sue is the nickname given to FMNH PR 2081, which is one of the largest, most extensive, and best preserved Tyrannosaurus rex specimens ever found, at over 90 percent recovered by bulk. FMNH PR 2081 was discovered on August 12, 1990, by American explorer and fossil collector Sue Hendrickson, and was named after her. 

After ownership disputes were settled, the fossil was auctioned in October 1997 for US$8.3million, the highest amount ever paid for a dinosaur fossil until October 7, 2020 when T. rex Stan was auctioned for US$31.8 million.Sue is now a permanent feature at the Field Museum of Natural History in Chicago, Illinois.

Discovery
During the summer of 1990, a group of workers from the Black Hills Institute, located in Hill City, searched for fossils at the Cheyenne River Indian Reservation in western South Dakota near the city of Faith. By the end of the summer, the group had discovered Edmontosaurus bones and was ready to leave. 

However, a flat tire was discovered on their truck before the group could depart on August 12. While the rest of the group went into town to repair the truck, Sue Hendrickson decided to explore the nearby cliffs that the group had not checked. As she was walking along the base of a cliff, she discovered some small pieces of bone. 

She looked above her to see where the bones had originated, and observed larger bones protruding from the wall of the cliff. She returned to camp with two small pieces of the bones and reported the discovery to the president of the Black Hills Institute, Peter Larson. He determined that the bones were from a T. rex by their distinctive contour and texture. Later, closer examination of the site showed many visible bones above the ground and some articulated vertebrae.

The crew ordered extra plaster and, although some of the crew had to depart, Hendrickson and a few other workers began to uncover the bones. The group was excited, as it was evident that much of the dinosaur had been preserved. Previously discovered T. rex skeletons were usually missing over half of their bones. 

It was later determined that Sue was a record 90 percent complete by bulk, and 73 percent complete counting the elements.<ref>{{cite book |last1=Larson |first1=P |year=2008 |chapter=One Hundred Years of Tyrannosaurus rex: The Skeletons |editor1-last=Larson |editor2-last=Carpenter |title=Tyrannosaurus rex: The Tyrant King |publisher=Indiana University Press }}</ref> Of the 360 known T. rex bones, around 250 have been recovered. Scientists believe that this specimen was covered by water and mud soon after its death, which prevented other animals from carrying away the bones. Additionally, the rushing water mixed the skeleton together. 

When the fossil was found, the hip bones were above the skull and the leg bones were intertwined with the ribs. The large size and the excellent condition of the bones were also surprising. After the group completed excavating the bones, each block was covered in burlap and coated in plaster, followed by a transfer to the offices of the Black Hills Institute, where they began to clean the bones.

Dispute and auction
Soon after the fossils were found, a dispute arose over their legal ownership. The Black Hills Institute had obtained permission from the owner of the land, Maurice Williams, to excavate and remove the skeleton, and had paid Williams  for the remains. 

Williams later claimed that the money had not been for the sale of the fossil and that he had only allowed Larson to remove and clean the fossil for a later sale. Williams was a member of the Sioux tribe, and the tribe claimed the bones belonged to them. However, the property where the fossil had been found was held in trust by the United States Department of the Interior.

In 1992, the FBI and the South Dakota National Guard raided the site where the Black Hills Institute had been cleaning the bones and seized the fossil, charging Larson on 158 points. The government transferred the remains to the South Dakota School of Mines and Technology, where the skeleton was stored until the penal and civil legal disputes were settled. The United States Senate voted to not confirm the appointment of Kevin Schieffer as United States Attorney for the District of South Dakota after his controversial handling of the penal case.

In 1996, Larson was sentenced to a two-year prison sentence after being convicted on charges not directly related to Sue. After a lengthy civil case, the court decreed that Maurice Williams retained ownership, because as a beneficiary, he was protected by the law against an impulsive selling of real property, and the remains were returned in 1995.

Williams then decided to sell the remains, and contracted with Sotheby's to auction the property. Many were then worried that the fossil would end up in a private collection where people would not be able to observe it.Poling, Jeff: Reserving "Sue" , Retrieved on December 6, 2007 The Field Museum in Chicago was also concerned about this possibility, and decided to attempt to purchase Sue. However, the organization realized that they might have had difficulty securing funding and requested that companies and private citizens provide financial support. 

The California State University system, Walt Disney Parks and Resorts, McDonald's, Ronald McDonald House Charities, and individual donors agreed to assist in purchasing Sue for the Field Museum.

Preparation
The Field Museum hired a specialized moving company with experience in transporting delicate items to move the bones to Chicago. The truck arrived at the museum in October 1997. Two new research laboratories funded by McDonald's were created and staffed by Field Museum preparators whose job was to slowly and carefully remove all the rock, or "matrix", from the bones. One preparation lab was at the Field Museum itself, the other was at the newly opened Animal Kingdom in Disney World in Orlando. Millions of visitors observed the preparation of Sue's bones through glass windows in both labs. Footage of the work was also put on the museum's website. Several of the fossil's bones had never been discovered, so preparators produced models of the missing bones from plastic to complete the exhibit. The modeled bones were colored in a purplish hue so that visitors could observe which bones were real and which bones were plastic. The preparators also poured molds of each bone. All the molds were sent to a company outside Toronto to be cast in hollow plastic. The Field Museum kept one set of disarticulated casts in its research collection. The other sets were incorporated into mounted cast skeletons. One set of the casts was sent to Disney's Animal Kingdom in Florida to be presented for public display. Two other mounted casts were placed into a traveling tour that was sponsored by the McDonald's Corporation.

Once the preparators finished removing the matrix from each bone, it was sent to the museum's photographer who made high-quality photographs. From there, the museum's paleontologists began the study of the skeleton. In addition to photographing and studying each bone, the research staff also arranged for CT scanning of select bones. The skull was too large to fit into a medical CT scanner, so Boeing's Rocketdyne laboratory in California agreed to let the museum use their CT scanner that was normally used to inspect space shuttle parts.

 Life and death 

Bone damage

Close examination of the bones revealed that Sue was 28 years old at the time of death—the oldest T. rex known until Trix was found in 2013. A Nova episode said that the death occurred in a seasonal stream bed, which washed away some small bones. During life, this carnivore received several injuries and suffered from numerous pathologies. An injury to the right shoulder region of Sue resulted in a damaged shoulder blade, a torn tendon in the right arm most likely due to a struggle with prey, and three broken ribs. This damage subsequently healed (though one rib healed into two separate pieces), indicating Sue survived the incident. The left fibula is twice the diameter of the right one, likely the result of infection. Original reports of this broken bone were contradicted by the CT scans which showed no fracture. The injuries to both the left fibula and the fused c26 and c27 caudal vertebrae show signs consistent with the bone infection osteomyelitis.

Multiple holes in the front of the skull were originally thought to be either from a bacterial infection or bite marks by some other tyrannosaur. A subsequent study found these to be areas of parasitic infection instead, possibly from an infestation of an ancestral form of Trichomonas gallinae, a protozoan parasite that infests birds and ultimately leads to death by starvation due to internal swelling of the neck. Damage to the back end of the skull was interpreted early on as a fatal bite wound. Subsequent study by Field Museum paleontologists found no bite marks. The distortion and breakage seen in some of the bones in the back of the skull was likely caused by post-mortem trampling. Some of the tail vertebrae are fused in a pattern typical of arthritis due to injury. The animal is also believed to have suffered from gout. Scholars debate exactly how the animal died; the cause of death is ultimately unknown.

 Size 

Displayed separately from the whole body, the skull weighs . Sue is one of the largest Tyrannosaurus specimens, with "Scotty": RSM P2523.8 the only specimen with a similar size.

 Exhibition 
After the bones were prepared, photographed and studied, they were sent to New Jersey where work began on making the mount. This work consists of bending steel to support each bone safely and to display the entire skeleton articulated as it was in life. Parts of the skull had been crushed and broken and thus appeared distorted. This also provides scientists with easier access to the skull as they continue to study it. The museum made a cast of the skull, and altered this cast to remove the distortions, thus approximating what the original undistorted skull may have looked like. The cast skull was also lighter, allowing it to be displayed on the mount without the use of a steel upright under the head. The original skull is exhibited in a case that can be opened to allow researchers access for study. Originally, the Field Museum had plans to incorporate SUE into their preexisting dinosaur exhibit on the second floor, but had little left in their budget to do so after purchasing it. Instead, the T. rex was put on display near the entrance on the first floor of the museum where it would remain for the next 18 years.

Sue was unveiled on May 17, 2000, with more than 10,000 visitors. John Gurche, a paleoartist,  painted a mural of a Tyrannosaurus for the exhibit.

 New suite (2019) 

In early 2018, Sue was dismantled and moved to its own gallery in the Evolving Planet exhibit hall. Opened on December 21, 2018, the reassembly is intended to reflect the newest scientific theories, as well include the proper furcula and attachment of the gastralia to the rest of the skeleton. The new, 5,100 square-foot exhibit includes animated videos of Sue that are projected in 6K onto nine-foot tall panes behind its skeleton. Atlantic Productions worked with the Field Museum, as well as Chicago's Adler Planetarium, to create multiple animated sequences, including Sue scavenging an Ankylosaurus carcass, battling a Triceratops, and hunting an Edmontosaurus. According to the Field Museum's curator of dinosaurs, paleontologist Pete Makovicky, the suite was designed to accentuate the size and stature of Sue, and although smaller, the exhibit allows for a more intimate display of the T. rex, along with the skull of a Triceratops and other Cretaceous period artifacts, such as shark teeth and pachycephalosaurid bones. Sue's real skull is studied so often that it is kept in a separate display in the exhibition.

In the media
A 1997 episode of the PBS show Nova, "Curse of the T. Rex", discussed the history of the discovery and ensuing legal challenges.

Director Todd Miller's documentary Dinosaur 13, which is about Sue's discovery and subsequent legal actions, appeared at the 2014 Sundance Film Festival.

In 2015, an episode of NPR's Planet Money discussed the acquisition of Sue from a financial and legal perspective.

The personified dinosaur, through Sue's official Twitter and Field Museum press releases, uses the singular they pronoun as the specimen's sex has not been determined.

Sue was featured in the Dresden Files book series book 7, Dead Beat, as being part of the Field Museum exhibits; the central character later uses Sue to ride into battle as a reanimated zombie T. rex.

The show Dinosaurs: Inside and Out extensively discussed Sue and mentioned they succumbed to a fatal T. rex'' bite to the back of the head.

Sue was the subject of a 2000 educational computer game called "I See SUE," which was published by Simon and Schuster Interactive.

See also

 Big John (dinosaur)
 Black Beauty (dinosaur)
 Dippy
 Jane (dinosaur)
 Peck's Rex
 Specimens of Tyrannosaurus
 Stan (dinosaur)
 Timeline of tyrannosaur research
 Trix (dinosaur)
List of dinosaur specimens sold at auction

Notes

References

Further reading

External links

 Sue at the Field Museum
 The Story of a Dinosaur Named SUE at the Black Hills Institute of Geological Research

1990 in paleontology
Collection of the Field Museum of Natural History
Field Museum of Natural History
Paleontology in South Dakota
Dinosaur fossils
Tyrannosaurus
Cretaceous fossil record